Qasim Khan (died 1469) was the first Khan of the Qasim Khanate.

Qasim Khan may also refer to:

Qasim Khan (cricketer) (born 1993), Afghan cricketer
Qasim Abbas Khan, Pakistani politician

See also

Qasem Khan, village in North Khorasan Province, Iran
Qasem Khan, Razavi Khorasan, village in Iran
Kasym Khan, of the Kazakh Khanate